Empress Song (宋皇后) may refer to:

Empress Song (Han dynasty) (died 178), empress of the Han dynasty
Song Fujin (died 945), empress of the Southern Tang dynasty
Empress Song (Song dynasty) (952–995), empress of the Song dynasty

See also
Queen Song (1440–1521), Korean queen of Joseon

Song